Lucknow Central is a 2017 Indian Hindi-language prison film directed by Ranjit Tiwari, written by Aseem Arrora, and produced by Nikkhil Advani, Monisha Advani and Madhu Bhojwani under Emmay Entertainment with Viacom 18 Motion Pictures. The film stars Farhan Akhtar, Diana Penty, Ronit Roy, Gippy Grewal, Deepak Dobriyal, Rajesh Sharma and Inaamulhaq in leading roles. It was released worldwide on 15 September 2017.

Plot

Kishen Mohan Girhotra (Farhan Akhtar) is a young man who belongs to Moradabad, a city in Uttar Pradesh. One unfateful day, Kishen gets accused of murder which lands him in Lucknow Central Jail, where he's awaiting his High Court trial for the death penalty. Meanwhile, a diligent NGO worker Gayatri Kashyap (Diana Penty), is compelled to form a band of prisoners for the band competition, which is to be held in the dreaded jail of Lucknow Central that year, and this is how Kishen's and her paths cross. Kishen befriends four other inmates – Dikkat Ansari, Victor Chattopahdyay, Purushottam Pandit, Parminder Gill – convincing them to join the band. The dramatic narrative portrays how Kishen's life progresses in jail and how music becomes an intricate part of his journey, and the rest of the band's as well.

Cast

 Farhan Akhtar as Kishan Mohan Girhotra
 Diana Penty as Gayatri Kashyap
 Ronit Roy as Raja Shrivastava (Police)
 Gippy Grewal as Parminder Singh Gill aka Pali
 Deepak Dobriyal as Victor Chattopadhyay
 Rajesh Sharma as Purushottam Madan Pandit
 Manav Vij as Tilakdhari 
 Inaamulhaq as Dikkat Ansari
 Ravi Kissen as CM Pawan Singh Chaturvedi
 Brijendra Kala as Advocate Trivedi
 Virendra Saxena as IG (Police)
 Alok Pandey as Bunty

Production

Development
The official announcement of the film was made on 28 April 2016 through the Official YouTube Channel of Nikhil Advani's production house Emmay Entertainment where it was revealed that the title of the movie would be Lucknow Central. The idea to make this film was conceived when Ranjit Tiwari, the director of the movie, read in the newspaper about a group of convicts who had formed a music band known as Healing Hearts in Lucknow Central Jail. The popularity of the band was such that quite often, they were invited to perform at special functions outside the jail.

Before finalizing the script of Lucknow Central, the director and writer of the film got in touch with various music bands that were being operated from the central jails of India. The writer of the film Aseem Arora says that the story of Lucknow Central is inspired from real-life events that have taken place in Lucknow Central Jail, Delhi's Tihar Jail, Jammu's Kot Bhalwal Jail and Pune's Yerwada Jail.

Casting
In the year 2016, it was reported that the makers of the film had finalized Farhan Akhtar for the lead role in Lucknow Central. Farhan Akhtar said that he decided to do this film because he is inclined towards movies that deliver a message to the society. The actor said that "There should be a message that audience can take back home with them, be it in the form of an inspiration or social relevance, to me that it is very important." The role of Gayatri Kashyap was initially supposed to be played by an actress Kriti Sanon but she later opted out of the project as the shooting got delayed. In January 2017, actress Diana Penty was signed in to play the role of NGO Worker Gayatri Kashyap.

Filming
The principal photography of the film commenced on 10 January 2017 at Film City, Mumbai where a replica of Lucknow Central Jail had been created for the shooting of the film. Apart from Mumbai, the shooting of Lucknow Central was also done in Lucknow and Varanasi. The official trailer was launched on 26 July 2017. The film hit the theaters on 15 September 2017.

Soundtrack

The music is composed by Arjunna Harjaie, Sukhwinder Singh, Mychael Danna, Rochak Kohli and Tanishk Bagchi while the lyrics have been penned by Kumaar, Sukhwinder Singh, Mychael Danna and Adheesh Verma. Its first song, "Kaavaan Kaavaan", which is sung by Divya Kumar was released on 3 August 2017. The second song titled as "Meer-e-Kaarwan", which is sung by Amit Mishra and Neeti Mohan was released on 9 August 2017. The third single to be released was "Teen Kabootar", which is sung by Mohit Chauhan and Divya Kumar and rapped by Raftaar was released on 16 August 2017. The soundtrack was released by T-Series on 18 August 2017.

Critical reception

Rajeev Masand gave the film a rating of 2 out of 5 and said that, "A better title for Lucknow Central might have been Boredom Central. At nearly 2 hours and 30 minutes, it's far too long and far too dull to inspire any other response." Murtaza Ali Khan (film critic) of Huffington Post gave the film a rating of C- and said that, "'Lucknow Central' occasionally offers an interesting take on prison dynamics, but there is hardly anything here that we haven't seen before". Renuka Vyavahare of The Times of India praised the performances of the lead actors and said that, "What essentially works for LC is its classic ‘winning against all odds’ theme." The critic gave the film a rating of 3 out of 5. Rohit Vats of Hindustan Times felt that Lucknow Central is "too simple a narrative to capture the audience's imagination. We always know where it is heading." In conclusion the critic said that, "Lucknow Central fails to utilise its resources, especially Diana Penty, and loses out on a chance to become a really engaging film." and gave the film a rating of 2.5 out of 5. Saibal Chatterjee of NDTV gave the film a rating of 2 out of 5 and said that, "This is an unmemorable prison-break film but, because of some great supporting actors, Lucknow Central finds engaging moments."

Shubhra Gupta of The Indian Express gave the film a rating of 2 out of 5 and said that "It is the supporting cast which is spot on, especially Rajesh Sharma and Deepak Dobriyal. But more than anything else, it is the mawkish sentimentality which overcomes the story-telling." Kriti Tulsiani of News18 gave the film a rating of 1.5 out of 5 and said that "In a nutshell, despite a dependable cast and makers’ deep understanding of jail insides, Lucknow Central doesn't hit the right note and remains a film too far from perfect." Sukanya Verma of Rediff gave the film a rating of 2.5 out of 5 and said that, "'Low-hanging ambitions and straightforward conflict between negotiators of harm and reform renders Lucknow Central a surprising watch-ability'". Sonil Dedhia of Mid-Day gave the film a rating of 3 out of 5 and said that, "Farhan Akhtar, with an accent that's spot on, puts on an appreciable performance. The plusses in 'Lucknow Central' outnumber the weaknesses. It surely deserves a dekho."

Accolades

References

External links
 
 
 

2017 films
2017 action drama films
Indian action drama films
Films scored by Arjuna Harjai
Films scored by Rochak Kohli
Films scored by Tanishk Bagchi
Indian thriller drama films
2010s Hindi-language films
Films set in Lucknow
Indian prison films
2010s prison drama films
Films set in prison
Films about music and musicians
Viacom18 Studios films
Films shot in Lucknow
Films shot in Varanasi
Films shot in Uttar Pradesh
Films set in Uttar Pradesh